Eric James Zumbrunnen (November 4, 1964 – August 1, 2017) was a film editor who won the ACE Eddie Award for the film Being John Malkovich (1999).

Biography
Zumbrunnen graduated from the University of Southern California with a degree in journalism. From 1985 to 1987, Zumbrunnen was lead singer and guitarist in the Los Angeles proto-alt band, Holmes, alongside fellow singer and guitarist, Bart Lipton, keyboardist Kelly Bass, Bass player Robin Paulson and Drummer Paul Perme. Often referred to as "the 83rd hottest band in L.A.", Holmes was known mostly for its bizarre mashup hybrid tracks "Wagon Train to Hell" and "Ironsides".

Zumbrunnen was a member in the American Cinema Editors.

Zumbrunnen died from cancer on August 1, 2017.

Collaboration with Spike Jonze
Zumbrunnen had a notable collaboration with the director Spike Jonze. He edited Jonze's early short films How They Get There (1997) and Amarillo by Morning (1998). Jonze directed Being John Malkovich; in addition to winning the ACE Eddie for Zumbrunnen, that film was also nominated for the BAFTA Award for Best Editing. Their next collaboration, Adaptation. (2002), was nominated both for an ACE Eddie Award and for a Satellite Award for Best Editing. For their last collaboration, Zumbrunnen, paired with editor Jeff Buchanan, was again nominated for the Eddie for Jonze's Her (2013).

Filmography

 Gift (1993).
 How They Get There (1997). Short.
 Amarillo by Morning (1998). Documentary short.
 Lick the Star (1998). Short.
 Being John Malkovich (1999).
 Adaptation. (2002).
 Weezer – Video Capture Device: Treasures from the Vault 1991–2002 (2004). Compilation film with multiple directors and three editors. Zumbrunnen edited the "Buddy Holly" section directed by Jonze.
 Where the Wild Things Are (2009; with James Haygood).
 I'm Here (2010; with Stephen Berger).
 John Carter (2012).
 Her (2013; with Jeff Buchanan).

See also
 List of film director and editor collaborations

References

Further reading
Lombard, Matthew (2003). "The edit, the shot, the imagination An interview with Eric Zumbrunnen", Temple University webpage archived at Webcite from this original URL 2008-05-09.
 Interview with Zumbrunnen about the editing of Her (2013).

External links

1964 births
2017 deaths
University of Southern California alumni
American Cinema Editors
American film editors
Deaths from cancer in California